Hymenolepis is a South African genus of flowering plants in the daisy family.

Hymenolepis is differentiated from Athanasia by the pappus scales and slender capitulum. Some Euryops species are similar, but are distinguishable by their smaller flower heads that appear earlier, and their undivided leaves.

 Species

 Species in homotypic genus
In 1824, Kaulfuss used the same name, Hymenolepis, to refer to some ferns in the Polypodiaceae. Names created using this illegitimate generic name:
 Hymenolepis callifolia C.Chr. - Belvisia mucronata Copel.
 Hymenolepis glauca (Copel.) C.Chr. - Belvisia glauca (Copel.) Copel.
 Hymenolepis minor Copel. - Belvisia mucronata Copel.
 Hymenolepis novoguineensis (Rosenst.) C.Chr. - Belvisia novoguineensis (Rosenst.) Copel.
 Hymenolepis ophioglossoides Kaulf. - Belvisia spicata (L.f.) Mirb.
 Hymenolepis platyrhynchos Kunze - Belvisia platyrhynchos (Kunze) Copel.
 Hymenolepis rigidissima C.Chr.- ?
 Hymenolepis spicata (L.f.) C.Presl - Belvisia spicata (L.f.) Mirb.
 Hymenolepis validinervis Kunze - Belvisia validinervis (Kunze) Copel.
 Hymenolepis vaupelii Hieron. ex C. Chr. - Belvisia mucronata Copel.

References

Anthemideae
Endemic flora of South Africa
Asteraceae genera